The 8th Texas Cavalry Regiment, (1861–1865), popularly known as Terry's Texas Rangers, was a light cavalry regiment of Texas volunteers for the Confederate States Army assembled by Colonel Benjamin Franklin Terry in August 1861. Though lesser known than the Texas Brigade, famous for their actions during the Battle of Gettysburg, the 8th Texas Cavalry distinguished itself at several battles during the American Civil War. In four years of service, Terry's Texas Rangers fought in about 275 engagements in seven states. The regiment earned a reputation that ranked it among the most effective mounted regiments in the Western Theater of the American Civil War.

Organization, loss of commanders

Following the secession of Texas and its joining the Confederacy, Benjamin Franklin Terry, a wealthy slave holder and sugar planter, recruited and organized the regiment in August 1861 in Houston, Texas. Initially intended to serve in Virginia, the regiment instead was placed under the command of Confederate General Albert Sydney Johnston for service in west of the Mississippi. They soon saw combat, their first skirmish taking place on December 17, 1861, near Woodsonville, Kentucky, when they engaged the Union and were supported by the 6th Arkansas Infantry. The skirmish cost them Colonel Terry, who was killed in action. Lieutenant Colonel Thomas Lubbock next became colonel, but died of disease before taking command. John A. Wharton was then made colonel, and held the position until he was promoted to brigadier general. Wharton was in turn succeeded by Thomas Harrison.

Major battles and shock troops

Now a part of the Army of Tennessee led by General Braxton Bragg, the Texans' riding and shooting skills often caused them to be used as shock troops. Their first major action was at the Battle of Shiloh, where they distinguished themselves. They also supported Nathan Bedford Forrest's cavalry during the Battle of Murfreesboro. After that, they were sent behind enemy lines to harass the enemy and break their lines of communication. They were engaged in all three of the Battles of Chattanooga, the Battle of Chickamauga, the Knoxville Campaign, and the Atlanta Campaign.

The Rangers' ability in harassing the enemy was often called upon against William Tecumseh Sherman. By July 1864, Sherman's army had reached Atlanta. On July 30, Terry's Texas Rangers met the troops of Union Col. E. M. McCook, and defeated them. They then undertook to destroy the railway lines, though with little lasting effect. Following the loss of Atlanta, the regiment harassed the flanks of Sherman's force as it marched through Georgia, although by then the Confederacy lacked the strength to stop him. Their last engagement was at the Battle of Bentonville, where they made their final charge, losing three of their officers: Gustave Cook, the regimental colonel since Harrison had been promoted, Lieutenant Colonel Christian, and Major Jarmon. The regiment surrendered on April 26, 1865, with the rest of the Army of Tennessee.

List of documented soldiers

 Ephraim Shelby Dodd
 George Harrison Grosvenor May
 John Goodwin Haynie
 Thomas McKinney Jack
 Oswald Tilghman
 William Andrew Fletcher
 Silas Henry Vanschoubroek
 Cyrus S. Oberly
 George Morse Collinsworth Jr.

See also

Texas Civil War Confederate Units

References

Further reading
Bailey, Anne J. Texans in the Confederate Cavalry. McWhiney Foundation Press, 1995. .
Blackburn, James K. P., Reminiscences of the Terry Rangers, Littlefield Fund for Southern History, University of Texas, 1919.
Bush, Bryan S., Terry's Texas Rangers: History of the Eighth Texas Cavalry, Turner Publishing Company, 2002. 
Cutrer, Thomas W., Our Trust is in the God of Battles: The Civil War Letters of Robert Franklin Bunting, Chaplain, Terry's Texas Rangers, University of Tennessee Press, 2006. 
Cutrer, Thomas W., The Terry Texas Ranger Trilogy, State House Press, 1996, 
Fletcher, William Andrew, Rebel Private, Front and Rear.

External links

Terry's Texas Rangers at Handbook of Texas Online
Historical Reenactors, 8th Texas Cavalry (Terry's Texas Rangers Regiment) mounted
Diary of Ephraim Shelby Dodd : Member of Company D Terry's Texas Rangers, December 4, 1862--January 1, 1864 hosted by the Portal to Texas History
Mel Wheat's Terry's Texas Rangers Website
Terry's Texas Rangers", campaigns

Units and formations of the Confederate States Army from Texas
1861 establishments in Texas